Myrmecia eungellensis is an Australian bull ant species, a part of the genus Myrmecia. They are native to Australia. Myrmecia eungellensis is primarily seen only in Queensland.

Myrmecia eungellensis is mainly dark brown. The legs and antennae are of a lighter brown colour, and the thorax is a darker brown compared to the rest of the body and half golden yellow. The mandibles are the same colour as the legs and antennae.

References

Myrmeciinae
Hymenoptera of Australia
Insects described in 1991
Insects of Australia